Planchonella pinifolia is a species of plant in the family Sapotaceae. It is endemic to New Caledonia.

References

pinifolia
Endemic flora of New Caledonia
Endangered plants
Taxonomy articles created by Polbot
Plants described in 1912
Taxa named by Henri Ernest Baillon